Mother Svea or Mother Swea (Swedish: Moder Svea) is the female personification of Sweden and a patriotic emblem of the Swedish nation.

Background
Mother Svea is normally depicted as a powerful female warrior, valkyrie or shieldmaiden, frequently holding a shield and standing beside a lion. Svea is a Swedish female personal name which derives from svea, an old plural genitive form meaning "of the Swedes" or the Swea. It appears in Svea rike, a translation of the old Swedish word Sverige, the Swedish name for Sweden.

The popular image is considered to have been created by Swedish writer,  (1649–1725) when first introduced in his poem Svea Lycksaligheets Triumph (1672).

As a patriotic symbol,  Moder Svea  gained widespread popularity in Kunga Skald (1697), written by Swedish poet Gunno Eurelius (1661–1709) in honor of King Charles XI of Sweden. Eurelius was later ennobled with the name of Dahlstjerna.

Mother Svea appeared frequently as a national symbol in 19th-century Swedish literature and culture. She appeared on various Swedish banknotes for over seventy years, such as both the 5-kronor banknote printed between 1890–1952 and the 5-kronor banknote printed between 1954–1963.

Swedish singer Lena Philipsson and  composer Torgny Söderberg wrote a song entitled Moder Swea which was introduced in the 1995 album Lena Philipsson.

See also 
 Flag of Sweden
 National anthem of Sweden
 National personification
 Three Crowns

References

Sources

External links

Moder Sea  displayed in the Tumba Bruk printing plant in Tumba, Sweden

Swedish culture
National personifications
National symbols of Sweden
Fictional Swedish people